The 2019 Wake Forest Demon Deacons women's soccer team represented Wake Forest University during the 2019 NCAA Division I women's soccer season.  The Demon Deacons were led by head coach Tony Da Luz, in his seventeenth season.  They played home games at Spry Stadium.  This is the team's 25th season playing organized women's college soccer, all of which have been played in the Atlantic Coast Conference.

The Demon Deacons finished the season 6–8–4 overall, and 1–6–3 in ACC play to finish in twelfth place.  They did not qualify for the ACC Tournament and were not invited to the NCAA Tournament.

Squad

Roster

Updated August 28, 2020

Team management

Source:

Schedule

Source:

|-
!colspan=6 style=""| Exhibition

|-
!colspan=6 style=""| Non-Conference Regular season

|-
!colspan=6 style=""| ACC Regular season

Rankings

References

Wake Forest
Wake Forest Demon Deacons women's soccer seasons
2019 in sports in North Carolina